The Salley Historic District, located in Salley, South Carolina, consists of 99 contributing structures and 51 non-contributing resources, and provides a good example of a South Carolina rural community during the late nineteenth and early twentieth centuries. The town, located in Aiken County, South Carolina and incorporated in 1887, is named after D. H. Salley, owner of a large nearby plantation who was instrumental in the area's original development. The Salley Historic District was listed on the National Register of Historic Places on October 27, 2000.

References

Historic districts in Aiken County, South Carolina
National Register of Historic Places in Aiken County, South Carolina
Victorian architecture in South Carolina
Historic districts on the National Register of Historic Places in South Carolina